The Fifty Plus Advocate Newspaper was founded in January 1975. It is the oldest, continuously published mature market publication in the United States. 
It was originally known as The Senior Advocate newspaper.

The founder and publisher in 1975 was Philip Davis. At the time he was 23 years old making him the youngest founder of a similar publication. His major influence in starting a senior newspaper was Maggie Kuhn founder of the Gray Panthers. As a 22-year-old reporter, Davis heard Maggie Kuhn speak at Quinsigamond Community College in Worcester, Massachusetts. She talked about being forced to retire at 65. Davis found her speech very uplifting and decided to try to get into the senior newspaper field.

Circulation
Circulation in 1975 was limited to Worcester County, Massachusetts. In 1988 the publication expanded into the Boston Market. Currently there are four editions (Boston Metropolitan Area; Central Massachusetts; South Shore of Boston and the Western Suburbs of Boston. Combined monthly circulation is 80,000 newspapers.

Member North American Mature Publishers Association
The Fifty Plus Advocate newspaper is a member of the North American Mature Publishers Association (NAMPA).

www.fiftyplusadvocate.com
The Fifty Plus Advocate newspaper is partnered with www.fiftyplusadvocate.com. A full year of newspapers are downloadable in pdf format at this web site at no charge.

Awards
The Fifty Plus Advocate newspaper has won numerous awards including the Vision Action Leadership Award from the Massachusetts Association of Councils on Aging; Mature Media National Award for excellence in Journalism and North American Mature Publishers Association Award for editorial and design.

References

Newspapers published in Massachusetts